The Open Our Democracy Act is a bill introduced in the United States House of Representatives by U.S. Representative John Delaney. The bill would establish Election Day as a federal holiday, mandate open and top-two primary elections so that all eligible voters can participate in them, and end gerrymandering by requiring independent commissions to draw the districts in each state.

History 
The bill has been cosponsored by House representatives John Yarmuth, Derek Kilmer, Jared Polis, and Scott Peters. The most recently documented action on it was a review by the United States House Judiciary Subcommittee on the Constitution and Civil Justice. It has not yet been voted on or gone on the House Calendar.

Delaney submitted the current version of the bill on July 21, 2017, in the 115th Congress. Delaney had previously proposed two similar bills, one in 2015 (H.R. 2655 of the 114th Congress), and another 2014 (H.R. 5334 of the 113th Congress). In both cases, the House did not bring the bill to a vote.

See also 
 Electoral reform in the United States
 Redistricting
 United States congressional apportionment

References

External links 
 Full text of the bill
 Rep. Delaney explaining the need for the bill - Washington Post

Proposed legislation of the 113th United States Congress
Proposed legislation of the 114th United States Congress
Proposed legislation of the 115th United States Congress
United States proposed federal government administration legislation
Electoral reform in the United States